Yeung Uk Tsuen is a village in Wang Chau, Yuen Long District, Hong Kong.

Administration
Yeung Uk Tsuen is a recognized village under the New Territories Small House Policy. It is one of the 37 villages represented within the Ping Shan Rural Committee. For electoral purposes, Yeung Uk Tsuen is part of the Ping Shan North constituency.

History
The nearby I Shing Temple was built in 1718 by the residents of six villages of Wang Chau: Sai Tau Wai, Tung Tau Wai, Lam Uk Tsuen, Chung Sum Wai, Fuk Hing Tsuen and Yeung Uk Tsuen.

References

External links

 Delineation of area of existing village Yeung Uk Tsuen (Ping Shan) for election of resident representative (2019 to 2022)

Villages in Yuen Long District, Hong Kong
Wang Chau (Yuen Long)